County routes in Seneca County, New York, are not posted on route markers; however, several routes are known only as "County Road #" and are signed as such on street blade signs. The designation is only occasionally shown on street blade signs for routes that have other names. Numbers are generally assigned from the Wayne County line in the north to the Schuyler and Tompkins county lines in the south.

Route list

See also

County routes in New York

References

External links
Empire State Roads – Seneca County Roads